Francesco van Hattum (born 17 November 1958 in New Plymouth) is a former New Zealand football player who was a goalkeeper during the country's first World Cup finals tournament in 1982. His international career started in 1980, and he played a total of 41 times for his country including unofficial matches.

Career
Van Hattum made his official All Whites debut in a 2–0 win over Fiji on 21 February 1980 and ended his international playing career with 28 A-international caps to his credit, his final cap an appearance in a 1–2 loss to Australia on 2 November 1986.

Controversially, van Hattum replaced Richard Wilson as goalkeeper for all three games at the finals tournament in Spain despite Wilson's having played in all fifteen of New Zealand's qualifying matches.

Van Hattum was rated 2nd behind Mark Bosnich of Australia in the Oceania Goalkeeper of the Century category in International Federation of Football History and Statistics' Century Elections.

Serving as a director on the New Zealand Football Board, van Hattum stood for re-election at the AGM for an expected board shake-up and was elected Chairman of the seven person board on 25 June 2008. He also serves on the FIFA Associations Committee. On 23 January 2014 Van Hattum announced his intention to step down as chairman at the February board meeting.

Family
The son of a goalkeeper coach, Frits van Hattum, Frank comes from a sporting family with two of his sisters, Marie-Jose Cooper and Grazia MacIntosh, have also represented New Zealand with the New Zealand women's national football team, the Football Ferns, while nephew Oskar van Hattum is a New Zealand under-17 international.

His youngest sister, Stella Pennell, represented New Zealand with the New Zealand Karate Federation – first as competitor, then as Women's coach.

Honours

Club
Manurewa
Chatham Cup: 1978

See also
 New Zealand national football team
 List of New Zealand international footballers

References

External links
New Zealand 1982 World Cup squad

1958 births
Living people
New Zealand association footballers
People educated at Francis Douglas Memorial College
New Zealand international footballers
Association football goalkeepers
Manurewa AFC players
Papatoetoe AFC players
New Zealand people of Dutch descent
Sportspeople from New Plymouth
New Zealand association football chairmen and investors
1980 Oceania Cup players
1982 FIFA World Cup players